Quofaloma is an unincorporated community in Holmes County, in the U.S. state of Mississippi.

History
Quofaloma is a name derived from the Choctaw language purported to mean either "panther branch" or "quail cover". A variant name is "Quofaloma Plantation".

References

Unincorporated communities in Mississippi
Unincorporated communities in Holmes County, Mississippi
Mississippi placenames of Native American origin